The flag of Bremen (used by both the city of Bremen, Germany, and the state Free Hanseatic City of Bremen, Germany) consists of at least eight equal horizontal stripes of red alternating with white, and checked at the hoist. The civil flag does not contain the coat of arms.
The state flag exists in three versions
 The , which is defaced with the middle coat of arms.
 The , which is defaced with the flag version of the coat of arms and usually has twelve instead of eight stripes.
 The , which is defaced with the flag version of the coat of arms in the centre and a blue anchor in a white canton. It is used on state buildings used for shipping and navigation, and as the jack on Bremen ships.

History

See also 
 Coat of arms of Bremen
 Flags of German states

External links 
 official site about the flag and coat of arms of Bremen (German)
 
 

Bremen
Bremen
Culture of Bremen (state)
Culture in Bremen (city)
Bremen
Bremen